History, Labour, and Freedom: Themes from Marx is a 1988 book by the philosopher G. A. Cohen.

Reception
History, Labour, and Freedom received a positive review from the political scientist David McLellan in Political Studies. The book was also reviewed by William H. Shaw in Inquiry, McLellan in The Times Literary Supplement, Daniel Little in Political Theory, and Andrew Levine in The Journal of Philosophy.

McLellan credited Cohen with "lucidity and sharpness of argument", and with offering important reformulations of the theory of historical revisionism put forward in Karl Marx's Theory of History (1978). He considered Cohen's "discussion of the strength of nonmaterial
cultural elements such as religion and nationalism" particularly interesting, and found Cohen's discussion of the questions of how capitalism should be overcome, what form socialist society should take, and "the practical implications of the changing nature of the working class" to be "stimulating and relevant".

See also
 Analytical Marxism

References

Bibliography
Books

 
 

Journals

  
  
  
  
  

1988 non-fiction books
Books about Karl Marx
Books by G. A. Cohen
English-language books
Marxist books
Oxford University Press books
Political philosophy literature